Kokoko is a 2012 Russian drama film directed by Dunya Smirnova.

Plot 
The film tells about the relationship of Lisa from the St. Petersburg intelligentsia and the ordinary provincial Vika, who are two sides of the same coin named Russia.

Cast 
 Anna Mikhalkova as Lisa
 Yana Troyanova as Vika
 Anna Parmas
 Yulia Snigir as Natasha (as Yuliya Snigir)
 Konstantin Shelestun as Kirill
 Yevgeny Muravich as Mitya
 Lyubov Arkus
 Sergey Borisov as Valerian
 Tatyana Ryabokon
 Gennadiy Smirnov as Lyonya

References

External links 
 

2012 films
Russian black comedy films
2010s Russian-language films
Russian comedy-drama films
2012 black comedy films
2012 comedy-drama films